Sand Spring Run is a tributary of White Deer Creek in Union County, Pennsylvania, in the United States. The stream is not designated as an impaired waterbody. It is a mountainous freestone stream and is mostly in Bald Eagle State Forest.

Course

Sand Spring Run begins in a shallow valley on a mountain in Lewis Township. It flows east for several tenths of a mile, passing through two ponds before turning south for several tenths of a mile as its valley deepens. The stream then turns west-southwest for a few tenths of a mile before turning south-southeast. After a few tenths of a mile, it crosses Interstate 80 and turns east-northeast for a few miles, flowing alongside Interstate 80 through a valley. It then receives an unnamed tributary from the left and enters West Buffalo Township. Here, the stream continues flowing east-northeast for a few miles, receiving an unnamed tributary from the right and one from the left. Its valley then broadens and it reaches its confluence with White Deer Creek.

Hydrology
Sand Spring Run is not designated as an impaired waterbody.

There is a stream gauge on Sand Spring Run near White Deer.

Geography and geology

Sand Spring Run is in the Ridge and Valley Freestone region. It is a mountainous freestone stream.

Watershed
The mouth of the stream is in the United States Geological Survey quadrangle of Williamsport SE. However, its source is in the quadrangle of 1186931. The stream's mouth is located near White Deer.

The designated use for Sand Spring Run is aquatic life. A road known as State Route 1010 (White Deer Pike Road/Sugar Valley Narrows Road) flows alongside the stream, as does Interstate 80.

History and recreation
Sand Spring Run was entered into the Geographic Names Information System on August 2, 1979. Its identifier in the 
Geographic Names Information System is 1186931.

The Sugar Valley Railroad, which was incorporated on October 19, 1900, passed near Sand Spring Run. However, it was abandoned by 1904 or 1905.

Virtually all of Sand Spring Run is within Bald Eagle State Forest.

Biology
Wild trout naturally reproduce in Sand Spring Run in its lower . Both brook trout and brown trout inhabit the stream.

See also
Mile Run (White Deer Creek), next tributary of White Deer Creek going downstream
Cowbell Hollow, next tributary of White Deer Creek going upstream
List of rivers of Pennsylvania

References

Rivers of Union County, Pennsylvania
Tributaries of White Deer Creek
Rivers of Pennsylvania